Potreros may refer to:

Landforms

Potrero (landform)
Pasture

Places 
Potrero, California, a census-designated place in San Diego County, California
Potrero Chico, a rock climbing area in Mexico
Potrero Generating Station, an electricity generating station in Potrero Point, San Francisco
Potrero Grande, a town in Panama
Potrero Hill, San Francisco, a neighborhood in San Francisco, California, USA
Potrero Hills (Solano County, California), a mountain range in Solano County, California
Potrero Point, a land mass extending into San Francisco Bay, San Francisco, California
Chimayo, New Mexico or Potrero de Chimayo, a census-designated place in New Mexico, USA
Potrero metro station, in Mexico City
Potrero (Mexico City Metrobús), a BRT station in Mexico City
Point Potrero, Richmond, California
San José del Potrero, a municipality in Honduras

Vessels
 SS Potrero del Llano, a Mexican oil tanker sunk during the Second World War

See also 
 El Potrero (disambiguation)